The Mauritius Broadcasting Corporation has been broadcasting shows from various parts to cater all languages in the multicultural country Mauritius. Shows in different languages are being broadcasting by MBC.

List of shows broadcast from India

Currently broadcasting fictional shows

Current broadcasts
 Anupamaa
 Bade Achhe Lagte Hain
 Bin Kuch Kahe
 Yeh Teri Galiyan
 Agniphera (TV series)
 Mere Sai - Shraddha Aur Saburi
 Kundali Bhagya
 RadhaKrishn
 Ishaaron Ishaaron Mein
 Bhakharwadi (TV series)
 Siddhi Vinayak
 Motu Patlu
 Naagin 2 
Dance Plus (season 5)
Siya Ke Ram
ViR: The Robot Boy

Bhojpuri 

 Hamara Gaon Hamara Desh

Marathi 
 Asambhav
 Abhal Maya
 Eka Lagnachi Doosri Gosht

Telugu 
 Pellinati Pramanulu
 Kalavari Kodallu
 Brindavanam
 Chinna Papa Periya Papa

Tamil 
 Kalyana parisu
 Manaivi

Currently broadcasting non-fictional shows 

 Dance Plus (season 5)

Formerly broadcast fiction shows (Used to broadcast)

Hindi 
 Ek Hazaaron Mein Meri Behna Hai
 Iss Pyaar Ko Kya Naam Doon?
 Iss Pyaar Ko Kya Naam Doon?...Ek Baar Phir
 Itna Karo Na Mujhe Pyaar
 Kaleerein
Bairi Piya (TV series)
Laagi Tujhse Lagan
 Pardes Mein Hai Mera Dil
 Ek Tha Raja Ek Thi Rani
 Teen Bahuraaniyaan
 Mrs. Kaushik Ki Paanch Bahuein
 Shastri Sisters
 Kyunki Saas Bhi Kabhi Bahu Thi
 Bahu Hamari Rajni Kant
 Pyaar Ka Dard Hai Meetha Meetha Pyaara Pyaara
 Tashan-e-Ishq
 Dahleez
 Meri Aashiqui Tum Se Hi
 Kalash - Ek Vishwaas
 Jaana Na Dil Se Door
 Piya Rangrezz
 Hitler Didi
 Tu Mera Hero
 Yahan Main Ghar Ghar Kheli
 Saraswatichandra
 Jai Jai Jai Bajrang Bali
 Devon Ke Dev...Mahadev
 Satrangi Sasural
 Yeh Kahan Aa Gaye Hum
 Bhaage Re Mann
 Yeh Vaada Raha
 Mahabharat
 Gangaa
Laagi Tujhse Lagan
Karn Sangini
Dance Plus (season 1)
Dance Plus (season 2)
Dance Plus (season 3)
Dance Plus (season 4)
Nach Baliye
Dil Hai Hindustani
The Great Indian Laughter Challenge
Dancing Queen (2008 Indian TV series)
Beyhadh
Suhani Si Ek Ladki
Mere Angne Mein
Yeh Un Dinon Ki Baat Hai
Kahaani Ghar Ghar Kii
Kumkum Bhagya
Yeh Hai Mohabbatein
Yeh Pyaar Nahi Toh Kya Hai
Mahabharat (2013 TV series)
Kullfi Kumarr Bajewala
Ek Rishta Saajhedari Ka
Piyaa Albela
Pavitra Rishta
Punar Vivaah
Geet – Hui Sabse Parayi
Kumkum Bhagya

List of shows broadcast from Pakistan

Currently broadcasting shows 
 Tawaan

Former broadcasting fictional shows 
 Nikhar Gaye Gulab Sare
 Kisi Ko Maan Liya Apna
 Meray Qatil Meray Dildar
 Meri Jaan
 Ishq Gumshuda
 Aik Thi Misaal
 Tum Mere Paas Raho
 Sangat (TV series)

List of shows from Europe and Western countries

Currently broadcasting fictional shows 
 Un Palace Pour Deux 
 Homeland season 3
 Against the Wall
 Fringe season 4 
 Scandal 2
 The Good Wife season 4
 Hawaii 5-0 season 4
 Nikita 
 Rosario
 Bones season 9
 Grimm
Salvation
Sanctuary
The Blacklist (TV series)
The Mentalist
Chicago Med
White Collar (TV series)
Dexter (TV series)
Sons of Anarchy
The Secret Circle (TV series)
Revenge (TV series)
The Magicians (American TV series)
Being Human (British TV series)
Psych
Counterpart (TV series)
Supernatural (American TV series)
Charmed
The Vampire Diaries

Currently broadcasting non-fictional shows 
 Des chiffres et des lettres
 Envoyé spécial
 Thalassa

List of shows from Eastern Asian countries

Currently broadcasting fictional show 
 Happy Noodle

Mauritius Broadcasting Corporation
Lists